Kabondo, formerly commune of Brussels, is a north-eastern commune of the city of Kisangani, the capital of Tshopo province, in the Democratic Republic of the Congo.

References 

Kisangani
Communes of the Democratic Republic of the Congo